James Sykes may refer to:

James Sykes (Continental Congress) (1725–1792), American lawyer and Continental Congressman
James Sykes (governor) (1761–1822), American physician and Acting Governor of Delaware
Rod Sykes (James Rodney Winter Sykes, born 1929), Canadian politician, mayor of Calgary, Alberta
James Sykes (Canadian football) (born 1954), former CFL running back
Jim Sykes (born 1950), journalist
James Sykes (cricketer) (born 1992), Leicestershire County Cricket Club cricketer